is a late 10th century Japanese story. It is Japan's oldest full-length narrative.

Composition

The author is unknown. Minamoto no Shitagō is cited as a likely candidate; however, it may have had multiple authors spanning a number of years.

Title
The title of the story, Tale of the Hollow Tree, is taken from an incident early in the text. The protagonist Nakatada and his mother flee to the mountains and live in hollow cedar tree. The ateji 宇津保 are also used.

Contents

The story is twenty volumes in length and revolves around a mystical harp that passes through four generations. It belongs to the monogatari genre and is subclassified as a denki monogatari.

It contains the following chapters:

The story is generally divided into three major sections:
 Chapters 1-12: Toshikage is sent to China but shipwrecks in Persia. He obtains the mystical harps and returns to Japan. He has a daughter and teaches her music. The daughter has a son, Nakatada, and raises him in hollow tree. Nakatada seeks marriage to Atemiya.
 Chapters 13-18: Various political rivalries revolving around the Nakatada household and the crown prince.
 Chapters 19-20: Nakatada passes on the family musical traditions to Inumiya

Translations
An English translation by Ziro Uraki was published in 1984 by Shinozaki Shorin under the title: 

The Tale of the Cavern  (Utsuho Monogatari)

Notes

References
 
 
 
 
 

Late Old Japanese texts
Monogatari
10th-century Japanese books